Mark William Davis (born October 19, 1960) is an American former professional baseball pitcher. Davis played in Major League Baseball (MLB) for the Philadelphia Phillies (1980–1981, 1993), San Francisco Giants (1983–1987), San Diego Padres (1987–1989, 1993–1994), Kansas City Royals (1990–1992), Atlanta Braves (1992), and Milwaukee Brewers (1997). Davis batted and threw left-handed.

Playing career
He spent parts of five seasons with the San Francisco Giants after being dealt along with Mike Krukow and minor-league outfielder C.L. Penigar from the Phillies for Joe Morgan and Al Holland on December 14, 1982. He became a primary reliever the following season, but he did not establish himself as a top reliever until being traded to San Diego during the  midseason.

He was a Cy Young Award winner in 1989 after a 1.85 ERA and 65 games finished in addition to his league-leading save total. In the last month of the season, he pitched 25 innings and did not allow any of the 19 runners he inherited to score. He was the fourth closer so honored in Award history.

Davis signed as a free agent for US$10 million with the Kansas City Royals before the  season. He pitched ineffectively early in the season and subsequently lost the closer role to Jeff Montgomery. He never came close to matching his accomplishments for San Diego, earning only eleven saves over the last eight seasons of his career.

In a 15-season MLB career, Davis posted a 51–84 record, with a 4.17 ERA, and 96 saves, in 624 games pitched.

Post-playing career
That October, he was promoted by the Kansas City Royals to Minor League Pitching Coordinator.

Personal life
Davis lives in Scottsdale, Arizona, with Candy, his wife. They have two sons and two daughters.

See also
 List of Major League Baseball annual saves leaders

References

External links

Mark Davis at Baseball Almanac
Mark Davis at Baseball Gauge

1960 births
Living people
American expatriate baseball players in Mexico
Arizona Diamondbacks coaches
Atlanta Braves players
Baseball coaches from California
Baseball players from California
Brevard County Manatees players
Chabot Gladiators baseball players
Charlotte Knights players
Cy Young Award winners
High Desert Mavericks players
Kansas City Royals players
Major League Baseball pitchers
Major League Baseball pitching coaches
Mexican League baseball pitchers
Milwaukee Brewers players
National League All-Stars
National League saves champions
Oklahoma City 89ers players
Omaha Royals players
People from Livermore, California
Philadelphia Phillies players
Phoenix Giants players
Reading Phillies players
Rojos del Águila de Veracruz players
San Diego Padres players
San Francisco Giants players
Spartanburg Phillies players
Tucson Toros players